Ivan Novikov may refer to:

Ivan Novikov (writer) (1877–1959)
Ivan Novikov (lieutenant) (1921–1959)
Ivan Novikov (colonel) (1904–1976)
Ivan Novikov (ice hockey player) (1925–1950)
Ivan Novikov (surgeon) (1925–2016)